The 2019–20 Davidson Wildcats men's basketball team represented Davidson College during the 2019–20 NCAA Division I men's basketball season. The Wildcats were led by 31st-year head coach Bob McKillop and played their home games at the John M. Belk Arena in Davidson, North Carolina as members of the Atlantic 10 Conference. They finished the season 16–14, 10–8 in A-10 play to finish in seventh place. Their season ended when the A-10 tournament and all other postseason tournaments were canceled due to the ongoing coronavirus pandemic.

Previous season
The Wildcats finished the 2018–19 season 24–10, 14–4 to finish as runners-up in the Atlantic 10 regular season. They defeated Saint Joseph's in the quarterfinals of the A-10 tournament before losing to Saint Louis in the semifinals. They received an at-large bid to the National Invitation Tournament as a No. 4 seed, where they lost to Lipscomb in the first round.

Offseason

Departures

2019 recruiting class

Source

2020 recruiting class

Source

Roster

Schedule and results

|-
!colspan=9 style=| Exhibition

|-
!colspan=9 style=| Non-conference regular season

|-
!colspan=9 style=| A-10 regular season

|-
!colspan=9 style=| A-10 tournament

Source

References

Davidson Wildcats men's basketball seasons
Davidson
Davidson Wildcats men's basketball
Davidson Wildcats men's basketball